Arghya Roy Pradhan is an Indian Politician who currently serves as Chairman of Changrabandha Development Authority. He basically from the state of West Bengal. He is a two term member of the West Bengal Legislative Assembly.

Constituency
He represented the Tufanganj from 2011-2016 and Mekliganj in 2016.

Political Party  
He is from the All India Trinamool Congress.

Personal life
His father Amar Roy Pradhan was an eight time Member of the Indian Parliament  from Cooch Behar.

References 

West Bengal MLAs 2011–2016
West Bengal MLAs 2016–2021
Living people
Trinamool Congress politicians from West Bengal
Place of birth missing (living people)
1972 births